Mansourah is a town and commune in Mostaganem Province, Algeria. It is located in Mesra District. According to the 1998 census it has a population of 15,641.

References

Communes of Mostaganem Province
Algeria
Cities in Algeria